Luboš Tomíček (born 14 March 1986 in Prague, Czech Republic) is a former motorcycle speedway rider from the Czech Republic.

Career
Tomíček comes from a 3-generation motorsport family; his grandfather and father Luboš Tomíček Sr. were also professional speedway riders.

In 2003, he made his British league debut after riding four times for Oxford Cheetahs during the 2003 Elite League speedway season. The following season he joined Newcastle Diamonds and rode for them for two seasons.

He returned to Oxford in 2005, spending three seasons with them from 2005 to 2007. In 2007, he reached the final of the 2007 Speedway Under-21 World Championship and won a bronze medal at the Team Speedway Under-21 World Championship.

The following season he appeared in the 2008 Speedway Grand Prix series and signed for Lakeside Hammers, where he helped the team finish second in the 2008 Elite League speedway season.

He won the league with his Prague club in 2012 and had a final season in Britain with the Berwick Bandits but retired after the 2012 season due to private reasons.

Speedway Grand Prix results

Honours 

 Individual World Championship (Speedway Grand Prix):
 2006 - 22nd place (4 points in 1 GP)
 2007 - 26th place (4 points in 1 GP)
 2008 - 19th place (8 points in 2 GP)
 Individual Speedway U-21 World Championship:
 2006  Terenzano - track reserve
 2007  Ostrów Wlkp. - 15th place (2 point)
 Speedway World Cup:
 ''2008 - 7th place (4 points in Event 2)
 Team Speedway U-21 World Championship:
 2005  Pardubice - 4th place (2 points)
 2007  Abensberg - Bronze medal (6 points)
 Individual Speedway U-19 European Championship:
 2003  Pocking - 13th place (5 points)
 2004  Rybnik - 11th place (6 points)
 2005  Mšeno - 12th place (5 points)
 European Speedway Club Champions:
 2004  Ljubljana - 4th place (8 points)
 2007  Miskolc - 4th place (5 points)
 Individual Czech Championship:
 2006  - 4th place
 2007  - 3rd place
 Individual U-21 Czech Championship:
 2001  - 5th place
 2002  - 4th place

References

1986 births
Living people
Sportspeople from Prague
Czech speedway riders
Berwick Bandits riders
Lakeside Hammers riders
Newcastle Diamonds riders
Oxford Cheetahs riders
Somerset Rebels riders
Stoke Potters riders